Hrant Ararati Bagratyan (born 18 October 1958) is an Armenian politician. He was the Prime Minister of Armenia from 2 February 1993 until 4 November 1996, and a former member of the Pan-Armenian National Movement political party. He is the current leader of the Freedom Party.

Education 
 1965-1975 studied at No. 49 school
 1975–1979 Yerevan State University, further-Institute of National Economy of Armenia.
 1976-1978 Institute of National Economy of Armenia. Faculty of public law. Lawyer.
 1983–1986 Post Graduate study at the Institute of Economy of Armenian Academy of Sciences.
 1987 - Defended PhD thesis on the theme “Material Stimulation of branch SRI (Scientific-Research Institute) and DD (Design Department).

Professional career
 1979 Engineer in "Armelectromash" Yerevan.
 1979–1981 Military Service Moscow.
 1981–1983 Deputy Director at "Soyuzkhimreactiv" Yerevan.
 1983–1986 Post Graduate Student at the Institute of Economy of Armenian Academy of Sciences.
 1987–1989 Senior scientific worker at the Institute of Economy of Armenian Academy of Sciences.
 1989–1990 Head of Division at the Institute of Economy of Armenian Academy of Sciences.
 1990–1991 Minister of Economy of Armenia, First Deputy of the Prime-Minister of Armenia.
 1991–1991 Acting Prime Minister of Armenia.
 1991–1993 Minister of Economy, Vice-Prime Minister of Armenia.
 1993–1996 Prime Minister of Armenia.
 1996–1997 Consultant of the International Monetary Fund, energy expert.
 1998–2006 Vice-President of the Board, Director of HR and Grape Purchase of Yerevan Brandy Company (Group Pernod Ricard).
 2006–2007 VTB Armenia Bank, consultant.
 2007–2009 Russian-Armenian University, professor  (Yerevan, Armenia), Kiev International University (Kiev, Ukraine), professor at the University of Banking affairs of National Bank of Ukraine.

Megaeconomics 
Hrant Bagratyan is the author of 61 scientific articles and 9 monographs. He is the founder of the new term "megaeconomics" and the theory behind this term. He considers megaeconomics as his greatest scientific achievement. 

According to the developments in the economic theory and its flexibility being dependent on changing circumstances and changing world, Bagratyan argues, that along with microeconomics and macroeconomics, there must also be a place for "megaeconomics", where economies are confronted in another, more global dimension.

Publications 
77 published works including 17 monographs
Monograph Material Stimulation of scientific-technical progress in Production, Yerevan, pub. House, Academy of Science ASR, 1989 (in Russian), 10.7 quires, Printed.
Monograph Payments Arrears in the Gas and Electric Power Sectors of the Russian Federation and Ukraine, IMF, 1997, Washington (in English), 1.5 quires, Printed.
Monograph State and Society, Moscow, Izograf 2000 (in Russian), 23 quires, Printed.
Monograph Land Reform: Issues of Theory and Practice, 30 quires, Printed.
Monograph Armenia on a Frontier of Centuries, Yerevan, Nairi, 2003 (in Armenian), Printed.
Monograph Integration of Ukraine and Russia in to European labor space, Kiev, UBS NBU, 2010 (in Ukrainian), printed.

Awards
 1995 “The Men of the Year” of ABI (American Biography Institute).
 1996 “The Men of the Millennium” of ABI (American Biography Institute).
 1997 Recognized PhD candidate by International Monetary Fund, Washington D.C.
 2006 By the independent journalists recognized as the best economic public man of  Armenia during the whole period of the independency of the country in 1991-2006.
 2005 Received PhD in Economics by Higher Attestation Committee of the Ministry of Education of Russian Federation,   Moscow.
 2010 Received PhD in Economics by Higher Attestation Committee of Ukraine,   Kiev

References

External links

1958 births
Living people
Politicians from Yerevan
Armenian State University of Economics alumni
Prime Ministers of Armenia
Pan-Armenian National Movement politicians
Armenian economists
Government ministers of Armenia